Güvəndik (also, Küvəndi, Geyyendik, Gyuvandik, and Nizhniy Geyendik) is a village in the Tovuz Rayon of Azerbaijan.  The village forms part of the municipality of Papaqçılar.

References 

Populated places in Tovuz District